Toys That Kill is a San Pedro-based punk rock band, formed from a previous incarnation known as F.Y.P. (1989–1999). Just after the release of the last F.Y.P. album, also titled Toys That Kill, Todd Congelliere and Sean Cole (vocalists/guitarists) along with new members Chachi Ferrara (bass) and Denis Fleps (drums) got together to form the new band.

They have toured Japan once, Europe twice and the U.S. once or twice a year since the year 2000. Congelliere, Ferrara, and Felix all play together in Underground Railroad to Candyland, another Recess Records act.

Discography

Studio albums
 The Citizen Abortion LP/CD - 2001 Recess Records
 Control the Sun LP/CD - 2003 Recess Records
 Shanked LP/CD - 2006 Recess Records
 Fambly 42 LP/CD - 2012 Recess Records
 Sentimental Ward LP/CD - 2016 Recess Records

EPs
 Razorcake Sister Series Vol. 1 7-inch - Razorcake Records
 Don't Take My Clone 7-inch - Dirtnap Records
 Flys 7-inch - Asian Man Records
 Fleshies/Toys That Kill split 7-inch picture disc - Geykido Comet Records
 Toys that Kill/Ragin Hormones split 7-inch - Stardumb Records (OUT OF PRINT)
 Joyce Manor/Toys That Kill split 7-inch - Recess Records

Compilations
 TRISKAIDEKAPHOBIA "A San Pedro Soundtrack" CD - Recess Records
 You Call This Music?! Volume 2 - Geykido Comet Records
 This Just In... Benefit For Indy Media - Geykido Comet Records
 God Save The Queers (A Tribute To The Queers)

Video/DVD
 THE RECESS VIDEO VHS/DVD
 Belt Fighting the Man (Rivethead, Dillinger Four, Toys That Kill live footage)
 Climb Up Music Video DVD Magazine

References

External links
 Official Site

Geykido Comet Records
Musical groups from Los Angeles
Pop punk groups from California
Asian Man Records artists
Recess Records artists